Okatibbee Creek is a stream in the U.S. state of Mississippi.

Okatibbee Dam on Okatibbee Creek impounds an  reservoir, which was constructed in the 1960s for flood control.

Okatibbee is a name derived from the Choctaw language meaning "ice therein". Many variant names or transliterations exist, including "Chickasahay Creek", "Oak-tib-be Haw Creek", "Oakitabaha Creek", "Oakitibbeha River", "Oakitibbihaha Creek", "Oakitibiha Creek", "Oaktibbeehaw River", "Oaktibbeha Creek", "Octibaha Creek", "Octibbeha Creek", "Octibha Creek", "Oka Teebehaw Creek", "Okatibaha Creek", "Okatibahah Creek", "Okattbahah Creek", "Oketibbyhaw Creek", "Oktibbeha Creek", and "Oktibea Creek".

References

Rivers of Mississippi
Rivers of Clarke County, Mississippi
Rivers of Lauderdale County, Mississippi
Rivers of Kemper County, Mississippi
Rivers of Neshoba County, Mississippi
Mississippi placenames of Native American origin